This is a list of characters from the Nickelodeon animated TV series Hey Arnold!, where most residents live in the fictional coastal city of Hillwood, in the state of Washington.

Main

Arnold Shortman

Arnold Phillip Shortman (voiced by J.D. Daniels in the pilot, Lane Toran in season 1, Phillip Van Dyke in seasons 2–3, Spencer Klein in season 4, 17 out of 20 episodes in season 5, and Hey Arnold! The Movie, Rusty Flood as a baby and young toddler in "Parents Day" and "Helga on the Couch", Alex D. Linz 2 out of 20 episodes from season 5, "April Fools Day", The Journal, Mason Vale Cotton in Hey Arnold! The Jungle Movie, and Zane VanWicklyn in Nickelodeon Extreme Tennis and Nickelodeon Kart Racers 3: Slime Speedway) is a 9-10-year-old dreamer and an idealist who is wise beyond his years, and who always tries to see the best in people and do the right thing. His parents, Miles, and Stella left to go to San Lorenzo when he was almost two years old but never came back to Hillwood. Whenever he sees someone in trouble, especially Helga, Arnold goes out of his way to help them out, even if it's not sensible to do so. Arnold often acts as the stable center to those around him, whether he's around his "family" in his paternal grandparents' boarding house, or around his friends at school. He lives in Sunset Arms boarding house with his grandparents, Phil and Gertrude.

Arnold has had two major crushes in the series; one on sixth-grader Ruth McDougal (through most of season 1) and one on a classmate named Lila Sawyer (from season 3–5). However, his most catalytic relationship is with his classmate and frenemy Helga Pataki. Helga is secretly in love with him, though to keep these feelings secret she bullies Arnold. Arnold is completely unaware of this fact for most of the series, other than the occasional hint from Helga and other classmates. Helga revealed her secret to Arnold during Hey Arnold! The Movie, but Arnold gave Helga the opportunity to take back her confession, attributing it to "the heat of the moment". In the made-for-TV sequel Hey Arnold! The Jungle Movie, Arnold returns Helga's feelings with a kiss of his own, after thanking Helga for her help in finding his parents and using her locket to help activate the device that releases the cure to the sleeping sickness which his parents had contracted before they could release the cure. It's also implied at the end of the movie that he and Helga become a couple, as Arnold holds hands with Helga (although Helga pretends to be hostile to Arnold at once in public). Arnold is friends with most of his fellow fourth-graders, with his best friend being Gerald Johanssen, whose friendship dates as far back as preschool.

Helga Pataki

Helga Geraldine Pataki (voiced by Francesca Marie Smith; voiced by Katie Bartlett as a toddler in "Helga on the Couch") is a 9-10-year-old rough and cynical girl. Like most of the students at P.S. 118 Elementary School she is a mean-spirited sociopath, but is also rude, bossy and deceitful, with a tomboyish front. She is often portrayed as the local bully and as Arnold's arch-rival yet love interest. She constantly bullies Arnold and other people, yet secretly loves him, which is obsessive to the point where she has made many shrines dedicated to him. She is an academically-gifted student and a talented writer of poetry for her age. She despises Arnold because he is a good influence and his football head is different from most others, despite everyone's heads being shaped differently from each other. She becomes the antagonist in some episodes and occasionally expresses interest in pursuing the latter as a career. The reason for this is that she is neglected by her parents and often disrespectfully calls them by their first names because she does not think they are worthy of being called "Mom" and "Dad". Her mother, Miriam, is usually depressed, forgetful, struggling to stay conscious, and frequently drinking smoothies and coffee. Helga relates very poorly to her. Her father, Bob, a successful pager salesman, who suffers from workaholism, rarely notices her existence, favoring her over-achieving, neurotic college-aged sister Olga, who Helga rarely gets along with. He never listens to Helga. Helga is also known for her catchword, "criminy!", which she normally exclaims when stressed.

Helga resents her older sister Olga, a perfectionist in her young adulthood.  Although Helga will do her best to avoid unnecessary contact with Olga, she has shown feelings of love for her sister from time to time, as in the episode "Olga Gets Engaged", when she intervenes on Olga's behalf, saving her from what would have been a bad marriage, and "Big Sis" when she reveals her jealousy of Olga's relationship with Lila. In the episode "Quality Time" it's revealed that she hates corn and is allergic to strawberries because they give her hives.

In The Jungle Movie, she is shown to have an extensive video library of Arnold which she and Phoebe convince Gerald to use for the contest for the class field trip that Arnold hoped to win to search for his parents, which proves successful. During the trip, Helga attempts to express her true feelings to Arnold who was not in the right frame of mind to hear it at the time and left abruptly leaving Helga heartbroken to the point she ripped up the picture of Arnold in her locket which she discards along with the fragments in the river. She briefly becomes angry at Arnold though after the class is captured by Lasombra and she sees Arnold crying while looking at a picture of his parents she forgives him and reaches for her locket only for her to remember she discarded it but finds that it and Arnold's torn picture was recovered and repaired by Brainy. She convinces Gerald in helping her free Arnold so they could reach the Green Eyes before Lasombra got there first. Together with Arnold and Gerald, they manage to find the Green Eyes. Helga also comes up with the idea to use her locket to replace the Corazon which was lost while they were struggling with Lasombra, which activates the mechanism to release the cure to the sleeping sickness curing the afflicted Green Eyes and Arnold's parents. While she was attempting to retrieve her locket Arnold thanked her for all she did and returns her feelings, resulting in them kissing, only to be interrupted by Gerald. At the end of the movie while it is implied that she and Arnold are now a couple, she reverted to her old ways when Arnold tried to hold her hand on the way to school with Gerald and Phoebe but secretly liked that Arnold made that attempt, and Arnold, now knowing how she thinks, is content to go along with it; she is only feigning hostility towards him in public to maintain her tough girl reputation.

Series creator Craig Bartlett revealed in a 2018 interview that Helga's appearance was inspired in part by a young Frida Kahlo.

Gerald Johanssen

Gerald Martin Johanssen (voiced by Jamil Walker Smith throughout the original series and Hey Arnold! The Movie, and Benjamin Flores Jr. in Hey Arnold! The Jungle Movie) is a 9-10-year-old boy and Arnold's best friend. He is an athletic and street-smart boy who is portrayed as loyal, though much less responsible than Arnold. Gerald has known Arnold for many years, most likely since preschool. Besides being Arnold's friend, Gerald also has a good deal of knowledge of many legendary stories in the city, or "urban legends" as he calls them. He apparently gets these myths from a source he has nicknamed "Fuzzy Slippers", mentioned in many episodes as his reliable assistant.

At school, Gerald is the class president and considers himself very cool, and apparently, so do his friends. When it was revealed that Arnold was on Rhonda's so-called "Cool List", and that Gerald was on her other list known as "The Geek List" (due to a grudge Rhonda had against him over running for class president), many classmates were surprised to find this out ("Cool Party").

His most distinct features are his tall, Kid 'n Play-style hair, and his shirt with the number 33 on it (he also wears 33 on sports uniforms). He has a crush on Phoebe, who shares the same feelings for him. It's implied that at the end of Hey Arnold!: The Jungle Movie that the two have become a couple as they are seen holding hands.

Supporting
 Phoebe Heyerdahl (voiced by Anndi McAfee) is the smartest girl in Arnold's class. She's Helga's 9-10-year-old best friend and confidante, though Helga tends to boss her around. Nevertheless, Phoebe acts sometimes as Helga's moral compass, advising her on what she should do. Her ethnicity is half-Japanese, half-European on her father's side and her mother is European-American (White Southerner), and she hails from Kentucky. Being the smartest girl in her class is very important for her, and she tries her hardest to be that way. Throughout the series, both she and Gerald have a love interest in one another, with Gerald implying a crush on her during Rhonda's party in the episode "Hey Harold". In Hey Arnold!: The Jungle Movie, Phoebe kisses Gerald on the lips and is both seen holding hands at the movie's end, having finally confessed their feelings for one another and thus becoming a couple.
 Harold Berman (voiced by Justin Shenkarow) is a Jewish American friend of Arnold. Although portrayed as the school bully during the first season, he became more of a companion to Arnold and the other kids later on as his antagonistic role increasingly shifted over to Wolfgang. Despite his frequent bullying and intimidation of other students, Harold's bullying never involves stealing lunch money and he's often revealed to be rather cowardly and usually cries for his mother whenever he gets scared or upset. He's sometimes referred to by the derisive nickname "fat boy", usually by Helga. He is overweight and in later episodes it's revealed that Harold has a soft spot. His best friends are Sid and Stinky.
 Stinky Peterson (sometimes spelled Petersen) (voiced by Christopher Walberg in the series, Jet Jurgensmeyer in The Jungle Movie) is a tall and lanky friend of Arnold's whose family is from Arkansas, and he is also one of Harold's best friends. Stinky has a Southern accent and a love for lemon pudding. His friendship with Harold had him originally portrayed in the first season as a bully who wore spiked wristbands and a sidekick of Harold's, though the former was later de-emphasized and he was reinvented as a more affectionate, mild-mannered, and romantic character viewed as the class "ladies man", as he's romantically attracted to several female characters. He's shown to make up excellent poems while Phoebe was feeling depressed.
 Sid (voiced by Sam Gifaldi in most episodes, Taylor Gifaldi in "April Fool's Day", and Aiden Lewandowski in The Jungle Movie) is a 9-10-year-old friend of Arnold and one of Harold's best friends with paranoid tendencies. He is always shown wearing a green baseball cap backward, a black leather jacket, jeans, and a pair of white Beatle boots. He often tells urban legends, with or without the assistance of Gerald. Perhaps his most well-known characteristic is that he typically ends up in ridiculous situations, such as becoming severely mysophobic, deciding to devote his life to Arnold after Arnold saves his life, and believing Stinky is a vampire, among other things.
 Rhonda Wellington Lloyd (voiced by Olivia Hack) is a 9-10-year-old rich, pompous, self-proclaimed fashion queen and friend of Arnold. She is one of the most popular students attending P.S. 118. Both of her parents are stereotypically preppy. Even though she is always seen as concerned about her style, Rhonda is a phenomenal athlete, practicing numerous contact sports, like baseball and football, not caring if she ruins her clothes or accessories. Rhonda started out as a background character throughout Season 1, but was given a larger role, that started with the season 2 episode "Rhonda's Glasses".  
 Eugene Horowitz (voiced by Christopher Castile, then Jarrett Lennon in season 1, then Benjamin Diskin for seasons 2–4, Blake McIver Ewing in season 5 and the movie and Gavin Lewis in The Jungle Movie) is a somewhat socially inept but optimistic friend of Arnold, the class jinx. Eugene is prone to several forms of misfortune and is often bullied. He believes Arnold is a jinx due to several of his past tragedies having occurred in Arnold's presence. Despite his theory, he has been shown on a number of occasions to suffer from his accidents in Arnold's absence. It's implied that he has a crush on Sheena.
 Lila Sawyer (voiced by Ashley Buccille) is a 9-10-year-old nice girl who came from a fictional farming community she calls "Pleasantville" and who lives with her father. Her mother is never seen or mentioned. Lila is Arnold's crush. However, she only prefers Arnold as a friend. She had a crush on Arnold's cousin Arnie. She knows that Helga loves Arnold and offered to help Helga become more like her in one episode. She is described by the show's creator as being a foil for Helga, someone who tries to suppress her darker side by acting overly nice and sweet similar to how Helga tries to cover her kind, sensitive side with bullying. Lila also has the same first name and last name of the celebrity Diane Sawyer. Lila is absent in Hey Arnold!: The Movie. In The Jungle Movie, she is only seen as a background cameo.

Sunset Arms boarders
 Oskar Kokoshka (voiced by Steve Viksten in the series and theatrical film, Wally Wingert in The Jungle Movie) is a lazy, inconsiderate, mooching immigrant from an Eastern European country (in one episode he is referred to as being Czechoslovakian), that remains unemployed through most of the series, until becoming a paperboy. He has a gambling problem, does not do what he promised, is unable to read the English language until getting assistance from Arnold, and is a pathological liar, even taking advantage of Arnold who often tries to help him out. His childish demeanor and whininess often irritate others. Despite all his negative, despicable personality traits, he does love his wife and feels really bad when he thinks he has let somebody down.  His voice resembles that of comedian Yakov Smirnoff and he occasionally utters Smirnoff's catchphrases. He shares his name with an Austrian artist.
 Suzie Kokoshka (voiced by Mary Scheer) is Oskar's hardworking, dedicated, mature, loving, and caring wife, who puts up with all of her husband's antics, selfishness, and laziness, though the two occasionally fight. In the episode "Baby Oskar" she has a cousin named Nancy and a nephew who is also named Oskar and was babysitting him for two days.
 Ernie Potts (voiced by Dom Irrera) is a short-statured and hot-headed demolitionist who has a Napoleon complex. In the episode "Ernie in Love," he develops a crush and starts dating a plus-size model named Lola.
 Mr. Hyunh (voiced by Baoan Coleman in the original series and also by Wally Wingert in Hey Arnold!: The Jungle Movie) – His last name (a misspelling of Huỳnh) is pronounced: "win." He is an immigrant from Vietnam, working in a Mexican restaurant. Despite having a heavy Vietnamese accent when speaking, it is revealed that he's very talented at singing country music with the singing voice provided by country singer Randy Travis. He can also play cello, guitar and trumpet quite well. One episode reveals that he has a long-lost daughter, Mai, whom he was separated from after he had asked a US soldier to take her out of Vietnam during the Fall of Saigon at the end of Vietnam War. They are finally reunited in the Christmas special "Arnold's Christmas", courtesy of Arnold, Gerald, and Helga. Mai's biological mother is never seen or mentioned, and no explanation is given for her absence.
Mr. Smith is a mysterious character who lived in the boarding house. His face is never seen, nor has his voice ever been heard. He is resented by the other boarders due to this secretive lifestyle, as he does not share many of the main boarding house facilities, which are limited, based on the number who live there. He only appears in the first season.
 Lana Vail (voiced by Christine Ebersole) is a lawyer who resides in the boarding house. She wears a purple suit and has brown hair. She was a minor character, to begin with, and has brief appearances throughout the series. She has her only speaking appearance in "Heat".
 Mr. Purdy (voiced by Joseph Purdy) – he is only mentioned once in the episode "Gerald Comes Over" when Arnold collects the rent money. There are suspicions of him sharing his room with a chicken, this from chicken noises as Gerald listens from outside his door, never revealed, but covered up by him.

Families

Shortman family
 Phillip "Phil" Shortman (voiced by Dan Castellaneta) is Arnold's cheery, fun-loving grandfather. He is 81 years old, as of the episode "Grandpa's Birthday". This would mean that he was born in 1917 since "Grampa's Birthday" was released in 1998. Arnold often comes to him for advice. He often tells Arnold stories about his past experiences, although he has a tendency to stretch the truth. Despite responding frivolously to Arnold's problems, he will often provide good wisdom. While his advice isn't usually the most helpful, his heart is always in the right place. He's a World War II veteran and claims to have single-handedly won the Battle of the Bulge by tricking a large troupe of Nazi soldiers into eating numerous cans of spoiled CHAM (a spoof of Spam), thereby poisoning them and creating a hole in the enemy line for the American troops to break through. Arnold does not believe his story at first, but it's later proven when Phil shows him a small monument of him hidden in some bushes in a park in Washington D.C. He likely married Pookie during the initial phase of the war, when America was still neutral. Phil was also a master at Chinese checkers in his youth, which earned him the nickname "Steely Phil". He's very healthy and spry for his age, as well as athletic. He has an older twin sister named Mitzi. When he and Mitzi were kids they used to be really close and they owned a Scottish Terrier named Pooter but one day he got out of their backyard and was killed by a milk truck after that day he and Mitzi stopped speaking to each other for 71 years. In the episode "Back to School", Phil admits to Arnold that he never graduated from grade school, because in 6th grade, on the Crash of 29, Grampa Phil was forced to drop out and work in a factory to help support his family, until he reached maturity in the latter phase of the Great Depression. This was until he reattended P.S. 118 in 1999 and earned his grade school diploma.  
 Gertrude "Pookie" Shortman (voiced by Tress MacNeille) is Arnold's wacky but wise paternal grandmother, Miles's mother, Stella's mother-in-law, and Mitzi's sister-in-law who is often seen doing outlandish things, including dressing up and acting like fictional and historic figures, such as Calamity Jane. She is called "Pookie" by Grandpa Phil and Gertie by Aunt Mitzi. She has a black belt. She and Phil had a similar relationship that Helga and Arnold have when they were Arnold's age (though her pranks were a bit more vicious and extreme), which implies that they are the same age.
 Miles and Stella Shortman (voiced by Craig Bartlett and Antoinette Stella) are Arnold's parents, Miles being Phil and Gertrude's son. They're adventurous and brave, though Miles appears to be clumsy and tends to end up hurt. They met while exploring in San Lorenzo, where they occasionally crossed paths with the Green-Eyed people, a mysterious indigenous tribe. They returned to the city after Arnold's birth, but were called back for "a final mission" when a friend informed them that the Green Eyes were in trouble; they failed to return, leaving their son under his grandparents' care. Arnold comes across a journal detailing some of their adventures years afterward. His pet pig, Abner, was a wedding gift to his parents from the Green Eyes. In The Jungle Movie, it is revealed that while trying to cure the adults of the Green Eyes who had caught the sleeping sickness they ran out of medicine and began to work on making more, but unfortunately, they ended up contracting sleeping sickness leaving only the Green Eyes' children to watch over them and the other adults. However, they managed to make enough of the cure and planned to aerosolize it so it could cure everyone using the Green Eyes' technology which was activated by the Corazon, a literal heart made of solid gold which was sought by the villainous river pirate Lasombra who pretends to be Miles and Stella's friend Eduardo to trick Arnold in leading him to the Corazon. However, the Corazon falls down a ravine while Arnold, Helga, Gerald, and the real Eduardo are struggling with Lasombra. Fortunately, Helga gets the idea to use her locket in place of the Corazon which she reveals to Arnold for the first time. It worked and the cure is released during the Green Eyes and Arnold's parents return home with their son.
 Arnie (voiced by Grant Hoover) is Arnold's maternal cousin, who lives in the countryside and strongly resembles Arnold. He likes to collect lint and gum, count things, read the ingredients on the back of food containers, and make a peculiar snorting sound on occasion. When he visits P.S. 118, Lila develops a crush on him and attempts to attract his attention, but he develops a crush on Helga. He's often seen as strange, gross, dull, or stupid by those around him. 
 Mitzi  Shortman (voiced by Phyllis Diller) is Arnold's paternal great aunt, Miles's paternal aunt, Stella's aunt-in-law, Gertrude's sister-in-law, Phil's twin sister, and childhood rival. She is 81 years old. When she and Phil were kids they had a Scottish Terrier named Pooter but then was killed by a milk truck and after that day she and her brother stopped speaking to each other for 71 years.
 Grandpa Phil's father (voiced by Dan Castellaneta) – He is often seen in Grandpa's flashbacks to the 1920s and likely served in World War I when Phil was in his infancy.
 Grandpa Phil's grandfather (voiced by Dan Castellaneta) – Having lived from 1850–1941, he is seen in one of Grandpa's flashbacks. Grandpa remembers during the 1930s, he was doing chores one winter while his friends were ice skating, only to be hit with a snowball by his grandfather who gave him permission to stop his chores and play.

Pataki family
 Robert "Big Bob" Pataki (voiced by Maurice LaMarche) is Olga and Helga's oafish, ambitious entrepreneur father, a successful beeper salesman who owns a beeper store. He has extremely high expectations for Helga and frequently compares her to her older sister Olga. Bob also frequently calls Helga by Olga's name by mistake and is often neglectful to her. However, Bob does care for Helga as is evidenced in subtle ways. Bob has difficulty showing his emotions for Helga since she and he always come into conflict with each other. He often mistakenly calls Arnold "Alfred". In The Jungle Movie, he still sells beepers despite Helga pointing out that nobody uses beepers anymore due to cellphones and it's implied that his business isn't as successful as it used to be.
 Miriam Pataki (voiced by Kath Soucie) is Olga and Helga's inattentive mother. It's hinted throughout the show that Miriam suffers from alcoholism, as she often drinks "smoothies" which sometimes contain ingredients found in alcoholic cocktails such as celery and tabasco sauce, forgets things, speaks in a slow, tired voice, has had her driver's license suspended, has to do community service and sleeps a lot (often in inappropriate places). Like Bob, it is shown in very subtle ways that she cares about Helga, such as checking in her room when she heard a crash. The unaired Hey Arnold! spin-off, The Patakis, would have included her struggle with alcoholism and joining of Alcoholics Anonymous as a plot point. However, in one episode when Bob injures his back and cannot work, Miriam fills in for him. During the episode Miriam sobers up and holds the fort. Miriam also becomes more attentive towards Helga until she becomes a workaholic and realizes that she is ignoring Helga. Then, she quits and makes Bob return to work. However, her sobriety doesn't  last long because in episodes following this one, she is back to drinking smoothies. Miriam was a champion bull rider before marrying Bob, and she used to be an Olympic class swimmer. She reveals in the episode "Olga Gets Engaged" that she regrets marrying Bob, which resulted in throwing her life away and presumably resulting in her insecurities.
 Olga Pataki (voiced by Nika Futterman) is Helga's intelligent, outgoing, beautiful older sister, who attends the fictional Wellington College, although in one episode, Helga says that Olga attends Bennington College, which is an existing college located in the U.S. state of Vermont. Olga clearly suffers from perfectionism. She possesses skills that demonstrate a high level of intelligence, as in the episode "Helga on the Couch", where she is shown to be a virtuoso pianist in one of Helga's flashbacks, and when Helga mentions that she was a straight-A student. She attended P.S. 118 as a child, and is praised by Helga's teachers for her achievements. Bob and Miriam consider Olga perfect, which bothers Helga. They sometimes confuse Helga with Olga. Olga gives Helga more attention than their parents and has good intentions, but Helga doesn't receive Olga's attention or intentions very well and often tries to push Olga away and keep her distance. It's revealed in "Helga on the Couch" that through the years Olga has reacted to her family's problems by being a perfectionist and keeping quiet about the situations at hand. Therefore, either Olga likes to avoid conflict since she rarely acknowledges her family's problems, is oblivious, or is in denial. She later reveals to Helga that she's envious of her, as unlike Olga, their parents never heaped unrealistic expectations onto Helga, comparing herself to a "wind-up doll" that performs for their parents. In The Jungle Movie she is Mr. Simmons's helper with chaperoning his students on a trip to San Lorenzo. When they arrive, she develops a crush on Che, a shipmate who turns out to be working for Lasombra, and is heartbroken when he locks her and the others up in jail. Later in the movie when her parents and Arnold's grandparents come to help them, Olga tells Big Bob that Che was mean to her and started chasing him and beating him up for breaking her heart.

Johanssen family
 Martin Johanssen (voiced by Rick Fitts) is Gerald's sometimes strict father, complains about wasting electricity. He is a Vietnam War veteran.
 Mrs. Johanssen (voiced by Shari Belafonte) is Gerald's very kind mother, keeps family together. She is a cashier at the neighborhood market.
 James "Jamie O" Johanssen (voiced by Ben Aaron Hoag and Phil LaMarr) is Gerald's teenage brother, who bullies him. In the episode "Jamie O in Love" Arnold and Gerald spy on him to find out why he was being so nice to them and found out that he had a girlfriend named Sharice. One day, after Jamie O dropped them off at a restaurant to eat lunch, they see Sharice and overhear a conversation between her and her friend that she does not really like Jamie O and was gonna milk him for all he is worth. Gerald tells Arnold not to say anything about it to him because they're worried if he told them that he'd stop being nice and would not drive them to an upcoming hockey game. Days later Jamie O is seen doing Sharice's laundry and making her a soufflé. While juggling to do all those things, Jamie O accidentally burns one of Sharice's cashmere socks and breaks down crying. Feeling conflicted, Gerald decided to tell Jamie O the truth about Sharice and he doesn't believe him until he overheard her talking to her friend that he's a sap, causing Jamie O to realize that Gerald was right, and as a result, Jamie O broke up with her offscreen. The next day, to show that he's sorry for not believing his brother, Jamie O drives Gerald and Arnold to the hockey stadium.
 Timberly Johanssen (voiced by Avriel Epps) is Gerald's little sister. She usually causes trouble due to her desire for attention or naturally childish behavior. Unlike all the other children on the show, Timberly seems to age throughout the series. In her first appearance, she's four years old, but she already attends the first grade in "Timberly Loves Arnold", although this may be a continuity error, rather than intentional.

Heyerdahl family
 Kyo Heyerdahl (voiced by George Takei) is Phoebe's half Japanese, half Norwegian father. He speaks Japanese fluently. However, his surname is not Japanese, it is Norwegian.
 Reba Heyerdahl (voiced by Jean Smart) is Phoebe's Southern American mother from Kentucky.

Berman family
 Jerry Berman (voiced by David Wohl) is Harold's father. He has a tendency of talking in a very low pitch, and is more concerned about Harold's obesity than his wife.
 Marilyn Berman (voiced by Kath Soucie) is Harold's mother. She is more vocal with her scolding of Harold than her husband.

Horowitz family
 Nate Horowitz (voiced by Michael Jeter) is Eugene's father. He is equally unlucky as his son as seen in the episode "Fishing Trip".
 Mrs. Horowitz is Eugene's mother (only appears in the episodes "Eugene's Birthday" and "Parents' Day") who, unlike Eugene and her husband who are redheads, is the only member of their family with blonde hair.

Lloyd family
 Buckley Lloyd (voiced by Sam McMurray) is Rhonda's father. Whenever Rhonda gets very upset, he buys her things to cheer her up.
 Brooke Lloyd (voiced by Lori Alan) is Rhonda's mother who believes her daughter is a perfect angel who can do no wrong. Most episodes she's seen talking on her cellphone.

Sawyer family
 Mr. Sawyer (voiced by Dan Butler) is Lila's father, seen in the episode "Ms. Perfect". He appears to be a kind and caring father. When Lila is new to P.S. 118 and being bullied by some of her female classmates, her father tries to be there for her. In the episode it is revealed that he had been unemployed and it ends happily with him getting a job.

Other characters

Other students of PS 118
 Thaddeus "Curly" Gammelthorpe (voiced by Adam Wylie in most episodes, Haley Joel Osment in "Deconstructing Arnold", Steven Hartman in "Downtown as Fruits", Michael Welch in "Ghost Bride" and "Curly's Girl", and Nicolas Cantu in The Jungle Movie) is the class sociopath, more so than most of P.S. 118's other students. He has had meltdowns and outbursts throughout the show such as in the episodes "False Alarm" and "Curly Snaps". He also appears to have a major crush on Rhonda. In the episode "Curly's Girl", Rhonda pretends to be Curly's girlfriend for a week after he cleaned her mother's new mink coat she wore for a school art show, but she is disgusted by his appeal.
 Torvald (voiced by Michael Bacall) is a fourth-grader who was held back for several years due to his poor math performance (to the point of not knowing the answer to 3x3) and is considerably older than the rest of the students. He is tutored by Arnold in one episode. In the episode "Tutoring Torvald", he is revealed to be 13 years old. He disappears from the series after Season 2.
 Sheena (voiced by Francesca Marie Smith) is a geeky girl who does not like violence. Her aunt Shelly is the school nurse, her uncle Earl rows a boat. It is implied that Sheena has a crush on Eugene Horowitz.
 Lorenzo (voiced by Victor Samuel Lopez) is a wealthy Hispanic American boy who did not have enough time to be a kid, by his mother's schedule. Arnold and the other kids teach him what it means to be a kid. In the episode "Arnold's Room" he and Sid are partners for a science project at school after seeing Lorenzo's bedroom, Sid is worried that his bedroom isn't good enough to show Lorenzo so he borrows Arnold's bedroom so they could work together. At the end of the episode when Arnold and the rest of his guy friends came over to play card games Sid knocks on the door and Lorenzo asks him why he is knocking if it is his own room then breaks down crying after explaining why he lied to him. Lorenzo forgave him if he promises never to lie to him again and to show that everything is hunky-dory Arnold invites them both to join him and the others in playing cards.
 Iggy (voiced by Justin Shenkarow in "Downtown as Fruits", Sam Gifaldi in "Heat", Marcus Toji in "Stoop Kid" and Joseph Ashton in "Arnold Betrays Iggy" and "Gerald's Game") is a friend of Arnold's who is considered popular amongst his classmates. During the first season, he was shown as something of a troublemaker who would sometimes co-operate with Harold in mischievous deeds. His shirt tails stick out like Arnold's, creating an illusion of a kilt, and he almost always wears dark sunglasses that he rarely takes off. Iggy is infamous for the episode "Arnold Betrays Iggy", where his classmates find out he wears pink and white bunny pajamas after Sid and Stinky discover it and he blames Arnold for it, angrily rejecting his apologetic actions until Arnold reluctantly subjects himself to a widely publicized humiliation from many of his kid and adult friends by wearing the same bunny pajamas in front of him in public; during this time, Iggy finds out that Sid and Stinky were the true culprits and tries to apologize to Arnold afterwards, but Arnold only gives him an angry look, implying that he is too angry to forgive him. In later episodes, however, there is no continuing animosity between the two as Iggy continued to associate with Arnold, implying that Arnold has either eventually forgiven him or the time has passed long enough to be as if it never happened.
 Brainy (voiced by Craig Bartlett) is a geek and Helga's stalker who is usually knocked unconscious by Helga without Helga looking at him. He seems to be romantically attracted to her. He has a very deep voice, wheezes noisily, and never talks in a completed sentence. He rarely appears except when Helga looks at her locket containing a picture of Arnold. Apparently Brainy hasn't told anybody else about Helga's crush on Arnold. He has the same hairstyle as Bart Simpson from The Simpsons. In The Jungle Movie, he continues to stalk Helga though he ends up helping her by retrieving her locket and Arnold's torn-up picture which Helga discarded in anger after Arnold had seemingly rejected her, giving the locket and the repaired picture back to Helga after the class had been captured by Lasombra. Having forgiven Arnold, Helga thanked Brainy by kissing him before rushing off much to his surprise and delight. Helga's locket would later play a key role in releasing the cure that cured Arnold's parents and the Green Eyes, which would not have been possible had Brainy not retrieved it for Helga.
 Nadine (voiced by Lauren Robinson in the series, Laya Hayes in The Jungle Movie) is a young entomologist and Rhonda's best friend. She tends to find a lot of Rhonda's more stuck-up opinions ridiculous. In the episode "Dinner for Four", she sets cockroaches free in a restaurant as a favour for Helga. This is the only episode where she has a bigger role than Rhonda, for her usual role is Rhonda's satellite character. In "Parents Day", Nadine is shown to be half black and half white on her mother and father's side respectively.
 Park (voiced by Marcus Toji) is a Korean-American boy who is a close friend of Arnold and others. In the episode "Longest Monday", it is revealed that he has a secret hideout at the local junkyard. He only speaks in seasons 1–3.
 Joey Stevenson (voiced by Justin Shenkarow in earlier appearances, Michael Fishman in later appearances) is an African-American boy who is easy to remember by knowing he is missing a tooth. He appears with Arnold's group of friends from time to time, though his most prominent roles are in the first season, when he was part of Harold's circle of friends, along with Iggy, Stinky, and Sid.
 Peapod Kid (voiced by Jamil Walker Smith) is a wealthy and well-spoken fourth-grade student. In "Downtown as Fruits" he was unnamed but was credited as "Peapod Kid" because his costume for the school play was a pea pod. The name stuck and in later episodes he is called Peapod or Peapod Kid by the other children.
 "Chocolate Boy" (voiced by Jordan Warkol) is a boy obsessed with chocolate. In "Chocolate Boy", it is revealed he eats chocolate because his nanny fed him large amounts of chocolate before she left to a "far away land called Delaware." Arnold helps break Chocolate Boy of his obsession, but he only becomes as equally over-excessive eating radishes as a replacement.
 Wolfgang (voiced by Toran Caudell) is the main bully of the block who is a fifth-grader and Arnold's arch-enemy. He is more of a bully than Helga, also runs the fifth grade, and leads the other fifth-grade bullies in their troublemaking against younger students. Similar to Arnold, Wolfgang is somewhat popular with many friends in his grade, aside from his mildly dimwitted right-hand man, Edmund. The character, introduced during the second season, was created as a way for Caudell to stay on the show, as he was going through puberty and he could no longer voice Arnold as a result.
 Edmund (voiced by Tim Wiley) is Wolfgang's best friend and sidekick. He often asks stupid questions, causing Wolfgang to remark "Shut up, Edmund."
 Mickey (voiced by Marty York) is a fifth-grader who is nicknamed "The Weasel" as seen in "Longest Monday."
 Gloria (voiced by Francesca Smith) is a girl who looks like Helga, but is more girly and has a nicer personality. Her first appearance is in "Magic Show" as a dream vision, but she is revealed to be a reality in "Helga's Boyfriend" when Stinky begins dating her, and appears as an extra in "Cool Party".
 Ludwig (voiced by Phillip Van Dyke) is a bully who only appears in the episode "New Bully on the Block", where after leaving juvenile hall, he, Arnold, and Wolfgang fight each other for control over Gerald Field. But at the end of the episode, Ludwig and Wolfgang become friends and attack Arnold and his friends, leaving them hanging on a football goal post well into the night. He never appeared again afterwards. His name is likely a reference to Ludwig van Beethoven, a famous classical composer, as a counterpoint to Wolfgang who shares his first name with classical composer Wolfgang Amadeus Mozart, and similar to Wolfgang, was created so that there would be an episode featuring Arnold's then-current voice actor (Klein) amongst his previous voice actors (Caudell and Van Dyke).
 Big Gino (voiced by Cameron Van Hoy) is the school's mafia boss and loan shark, who enjoys victimizing students, particularly Sid in "Big Gino" with harassment and threats, when they fail to pay back on time what is loaned. Despite being called "Big" Gino, he is actually very short and thin.
 Ruth P. McDougal (voiced by Lacey Chabert) is a sixth-grade girl who was Arnold's first crush. Arnold went on a date with her on Valentine's Day but realized that she was not very nice after he caught her red-handed with the waiter at the restaurant and left with him. In the episode "What's Opera Arnold?" She played the role of Carmen and Arnold played the role of Don José from the opera Carmen. But was interrupted by Helga who slingshot Ruth into a trap door on stage in the middle of the kissing scene.
 Connie and Maria (voiced by Pamela Hayden and Mayim Bialik respectively) are two sixth-grade girls, Maria is Mexican and often uses Spanish words in discussion. They ask Arnold and Gerald to be their dates in the episode " Sixth Grade Girls" although just to use them to make their boyfriends jealous, but both agree that they are sweet and have potential to attract their interest in the future, when they are older than fourth graders. The two often appear in later episodes when the sixth-grade classroom is shown, either with or without dialogue. In the episode "Phoebe Skips" They and along with their two other friends Cookie and Simone tricked Phoebe into doing their homework for them while they watched a soap opera. Near at the end of the episode, there was a new girl named Shavone who got transferred from the third grade to their sixth-grade class. They told Phoebe that they no longer needed her services and planned on making Shavone their new homework girl.
 Patricia "Big Patty" Smith (voiced by Danielle Judovits) is an ill-tempered sixth-grade girl who becomes Harold's friend (it is implied that the two may have romantic feelings for each other as well). She is only aggressive towards any student who picks on her, calling her a bad names, or saying mean things about her. In an earlier episode, she plans to fight Helga, but stages it instead. She even asks Helga if she and Arnold had feelings for each other, which Helga denies. In season 4, she becomes friends with Rhonda after they both attend the same finishing school together. She was also held back a couple of years and is 14 years old.
 Mr. and Mrs. Smith (voiced by Henry Gibson and Zelda Rubinstein respectively) are Patty's parents. They both have the medical condition of dwarfism, despite their daughter having giantism.

Staff of PS 118
 Superintendent Chaplin (voiced by Jack Angel) is an official who supervises schools in the city as seen in "Principal Simmons".
 Principal Wartz (voiced by David Wohl) is the strict, yet open-hearted principal of the school. In the episode "Full Moon" Harold, Stinky, and Sid mooned him and Principal Wartz didn't see their faces he saw Arnold first and accused him for mooning. Principal Wartz gave Arnold four weeks detention for not telling him who really did mooned him. Principal Wartz tells Arnold about how his friends put a frog in their teacher's desk. His friends got in big trouble with the teacher and she gave Principal Wartz a gold star for telling the truth which caused him to be beaten up by his friends and they called him a "Weasle" he didn't even go on a date until he was 23-years-old. Frustrated and impatient, Principal Wartz told Arnold that he was gonna check off the failure to cooperate box on his permanent record. Harold, Stinky and Sid come clean and broke down crying and Principal Wartz lets Arnold off the hook. In the episode "Suspended" he suspends Wolfgang for misusing the fire extinguisher. Harold decided to get himself suspended so he can get a break from school he calls Principal Wartz a "Stupid Dork" which has him suspended for a week. With his friends in school and nobody to hang out with, Harold comes up with crazy schemes to get back in school but was thwarted by Principal Wartz. Arnold tries to talk some sense into him but Principal Wartz suspenses him for two days. Arnold and Harold decided to copy the schools regulations but tells him that they have the old policy. Harold broke down crying and begging for forgiveness Principal Wartz accepts his apology and allows him back in school on the condition that he catches up on the work he missed and he also lifts Arnold's suspension.
 Dr. Bliss (voiced by Kathy Baker) is a child psychologist who evaluates the students of P.S. 118 for a day and later becomes Helga's psychoanalyst. She is also the second known character that is told by Helga that she loves Arnold. This character only appeared in one episode titled "Helga on the Couch." She became a background character in Hey Arnold!: The Movie.
 Miss Felter (voiced by Julia Louis-Dreyfus) is a substitute teacher who was one of Arnold's "crushes." This character only appeared in the episode "Crush on Teacher." In the episode Gerald overheard her talking in the teacher's lounge that she was gonna have dinner with Arnold but it was her fiance who has the same name as him.
 Mr. Frank is a sixth-grade teacher, who is quite bored with his job.
 Lieutenant Major Goose (voiced by John Garry) is Arnold's teacher for a short time (after Miss Slovak and before Mr. Simmons), a martinet. He also was Martin Johanssen's drill sergeant during the Vietnam War as seen in flashbacks in the "Veterans Day" episode.
 Lunch Lady (voiced by Kath E. Soucie and Danica Ivancevic) is a woman in charge of the school cafeteria. She is stereotypically brash in appearance, but sensitive to criticism of the cafeteria food.
 Mr. Packenham (voiced by Daniel Stern) is a fifth-grade teacher. He appears in "What's Opera, Arnold?" when he chaperones Arnold's class trip to the Opera and in "Back to School" when Arnold's grandpa returns to school for a grade school diploma while in fifth grade, during his rapid progress from fourth through to sixth grade.
 Miss Slovak (voiced by Tress MacNeille) is Arnold's enthusiastic teacher (in the first season and part of the second season). She leaves teaching to pursue a career in golf.
 Mr. Robert Simmons (voiced by Dan Butler) is Arnold's sensitive and caring teacher (since the second season). He replaced Miss Slovak. He emphasizes the unique value of every individual in his class, with his constant reminding that "you are all special in your own special way". In the episode "Principal Simmons" he becomes principal at P.S.118 but then when the entire student body started rebelling against him, he and Arnold went to Principal Wartz's house and begged him to come back to the school but also made him promise to not be so tough on the students. Mr. Simmons then went back to being a teacher. In The Jungle Movie he became Arnold's fifth-grade teacher and he chaperoned his students on the class trip to San Lorenzo. In 2018, Bartlett confirmed that Mr. Simmons was gay, which had been alluded to in the episode "Arnold's Thanksgiving" with the appearance of his partner, Peter.
 Nurse Shelly (voiced by Mary Gross) is the school nurse, and Sheena's Aunt. She had some speaking parts in some episodes. In the episode "Rhonda's Glasses" she gave Rhonda an eye test and helped her with her motion sickness. In the episode "April Fools Day" she helped Helga with her temporary blindness.
 Coach Jack Wittenberg (voiced by James Belushi) is the competitive school coach of many sports teams, which he often gets Arnold and his friends to join. He is portrayed as an aggressive and incompetent coach, and as such, is unable to motivate and guide his team properly. With Arnold's help, he is able to lead his team to victory, as in the episode "Synchronized Swimming", and is revealed to have a sensitive and considerate side. He has a poor sense of vocabulary, as he often mispronounces words while confidently verbose. In the episode "Best Man" he asks Arnold to be the best man in his wedding and also had Gerald, Sid and Stinky as his groomsmen.
 Tish Wittenberg (voiced by Cathy Moriarty) is Jack's wife who is the coach of the girls' teams. She and Jack often compete with one another. In the episode "Best Man" she asks Helga to be her maid of honor in her wedding.
 Tucker Wittenberg (voiced by Grant Gelt) is Jack's son who is a student of PS 118. In the episode Benchwarmer, his dad kept putting him in the game even though he did not think it was fair to his teammates until he stood up to his dad after he benched Arnold and his dad apologized to Tucker and Arnold for his actions. He and his parents made a cameo in The Jungle Movie.

Various
 Rex Smythe-Higgins (voiced by Tony Jay) is Grandpa's nemesis from when he was a child, of an esteemed British family, and often shown to have cheated against him in the past
 Rex Smythe-Higgins III (voiced by Joey Stinson) – His grandson, and similarly a rival to Arnold. However, unlike their grandfathers, the two have a respect for each other as they shook hands following Arnold winning a boat race which Rex refused to cheat in, and Rex even siding and helping Arnold rescue his pig Abner when his grandfather wanted to eat him.
 Dino Spumoni (voiced by Rick Corso) is a famous jazz singer based on Dean Martin and Frank Sinatra. In the episode "School Dance" he performs at Arnold's school dance but sings a very depressing song which causes Arnold's friends to get angry with him and after having a heart to heart conversation with Arnold in the dressing room he changes his tune by singing an upbeat song and having everyone dancing in the cafeteria where the dance was being held in. In the episode "Dino Checks Out" he fakes his death to have his record sales improve. Later in the episode, it is revealed that he lived in Arnold's grandparents' boarding house where he used to work as a construction worker and use to perform at night. Later in the episode, it is revealed that Dino wears a toupee on his head and had multiple marriages. He's Italian American.
 Don Reynolds (voiced by Harvey Korman) is Dino Spumoni's estranged, bitter partner and songwriter.
 Mr. Bailey (voiced by Vincent Schiavelli) is a worker of the Hall of Records. His first appearance is in the Christmas special, where Arnold comes to him to help find Mr. Hyunh's daughter, Mai. His second appearance is in the series' feature film, where he helps in trying to find the document of the "Tomato Incident". When he cannot find it, he tells Arnold about a man who keeps all kinds of historic records.
 Mayor Dixie (voiced by Tress MacNeille) is the female mayor of Hillwood. In Hey Arnold!: The Movie, she allows Scheck to redevelop Arnold's neighborhood, even though the city council rejected the idea. When she is shown Scheck destroying the document of the "Tomato Incident", she decides to make it a historic landmark once again.
 Mrs. Vitello (voiced by Elizabeth Ashley and Kath E. Soucie) is the owner of the neighborhood flower shop. In the episode "Part-Time Friends" She slipped on the floor of her flower shop and hurt her back but then Arnold and Gerald offered to run the flower shop for her while she rested her back.
 Councilman Marty Green (voiced by James Keane) is a dedicated butcher and later politician who works at Green Meats. He has two brothers, Dave and Benji, and a son who is a vegetarian. In the episode "Harold the Butcher" Harold steals a ham from his butcher shop and reluctantly has Harold work for him everyday after school for a week until he paid back the ham he tried to steal.
 Earl (voiced by Dan Castellaneta and Craig Bartlett) – He runs a passenger ferrying service across the lake to Elk Island, in a row boat. Despite his profession, he reveals that he cannot swim in the episode "Busses Bikes and Subways" He speaks with a suitable pirate accent, given his job, as well as other pirate stereotypes. He is also Sheena's uncle.
 Davy Jones (voiced by himself) – Former member of The Monkees. He and his band were shown at the end of the episode "Fishing Trip". When he told the audience that the band will take requests Harold asked him if he knew "Miss Susie Had A Tugboat" and they performed it on stage.
 Mickey Kaline (voiced by Ron Perlman) is a retired baseball star and Arnold's favorite player. Arnold caught his final home run ball. After retirement he ran his own baseball-themed restaurant, Mickey's Dog Pound. He is based on two famous baseball players, Mickey Mantle and Al Kaline.
 Jimmy Kafka (voiced by Richard Mulligan) is Phil's best friend when they were young kids. Phil often mentions him when he tells Arnold stories of his past exploits. They both have had a bittersweet relationship, based on many disagreements involving competitions and other activities, however deep down they are very close, despite possible continuity errors following season 1's "Part Time Friends" episode in which it is said that he has not spoken to him since falling out working together.
 Rabbi Goldberg (voiced by Elliott Gould) is a rabbi who gives Harold advice and guidance. In "Harold the Butcher", Rabbi Goldberg teaches Harold that stealing is wrong and he told Harold a story about when he was Harold's age that his friend stole a vest from a tailor's shop and was punished and had to work in the tailor's shop to see how much work it took to make a vest, and in "Harold's Bar Mitzvah", Goldberg helps Harold prepare for his Bar Mitzvah.
 Alphonse Perrier du von Scheck (voiced by Paul Sorvino) is a greedy developer who plans to tear down the neighborhood so he can build a mall, but is thwarted by Arnold, Helga, and Gerald.
 Lasombra (voiced by Alfred Molina) is a Central American treasure hunter and pirate who endeavors to steal a relic called the Corazon from the Green Eyed People. He disguised himself as Eduardo to trick Arnold and the others into luring him to find his parents and help the Green Eyed People. Near the end of The Jungle Movie he falls off a cliff to his death, after a scuffle with Arnold, Helga, Gerald and Eduardo and when he was hit by a poison dart which turned his skin green and made him go ballistic, but not before he tried to toss Arnold down a cliff and take the necklace.
 Che (voiced by Lane Toran) is a henchman of Lasombra. Helga's older sister Olga develops a crush on him before it's revealed that he works for Lasombra. Later in the movie when Arnold's grandparents and The Patakis come to San Lorenzo and rescue the others and after hearing that Che was mean to her, Big Bob starts chasing Che and beating him up for breaking Olga's heart.
 Paulo (voiced by Jamil Walker Smith) is a henchman of Lasombra.
 Nick Vermicelli (voiced by Dan Castellaneta) is one of Big Bob's business associates, and later an accomplice of Scheck.
 Stoop Kid (voiced by Danny Cooksey) is a teenage boy who lives on a stoop and never leaves it until episode "Stoop Kid", when Arnold coaxes Stoop Kid to finally have the courage to leave his stoop. The only other times Stoop Kid is seen off of his stoop are in the episodes "Arnold Betrays Iggy", where Stoop Kid is seen in the crowd of people near the end of the episode, "Eugene, Eugene!", when he is seen in the audience during the school's musical, and "Cool Party" when he was a guest at Arnold's 'geek' party.
 Campfire Lass (voiced by Francesca Marie Smith) is a young girl who is the head of a junior survivor skills based troop, called the Campfire Lads. She speaks with a Scottish accent, though Arnold thinks it is fake, and is often seen selling various goods to raise money for outings, or visits.
 Willie the Jolly Olly Man (voiced by Dan Castellaneta) is the local ice cream man who is most often referred to as the "Jolly Olly Man". Willie is the driver of an ice cream truck that is frequently seen driving around Arnold's town. Throughout the series he has been depicted as unfriendly, deranged, depressed and hated by his employer (who happens to be his father) until "Career Day", when Arnold helped him learn to adapt to the ways of his job and be nice to the children. On at least two occasions in later episodes however, he continues to reveal crazy tendencies. In one episode, he was the umpire at a baseball game Arnold and his friends played against the fifth graders.
 Eduardo (voiced by Carlos Alazraqui) is an anthropologist from a fictional Central American republic of San Lorenzo. He was friends with Arnold's parents, Miles and Stella, and helped them during their expeditions in San Lorenzo. He is the last person to ever talk to Arnold's parents before they disappeared into the dense jungle.
 Harvey (voiced by Lou Rawls) is the mailman who delivers mail and seems to occasionally give advice. He dislikes snow. In the episode "Gerald's Tonsills" he cheered Gerald up by telling him the story about his changing voice when he was about to sing in a school concert.
 Morrie and Vic (both voiced by John Mariano) are a duo often involved in criminal schemes. They set up a counterfeit penny operation in "Wheezin' Ed", work at an auto shop in "Grandpa's Packard", and are also seen as Oskar's friends in various episodes such as "Arnold as Cupid" and "Baby Oskar", frequently seen playing poker with him.

Animals
 Abner (vocal effects provided by Craig Bartlett) is Arnold's pet pig. He was a wedding gift from the Green-eyed People to Miles and Stella from a water basket. Phil wanted to cook Abner but Stella decided to keep the pig as a pet. Abner was mistaken for a girl by Stella, who wanted to name "her" Isabelle. In The Jungle Movie he stows away in Arnold's backpack on the trip to San Lorenzo. When Arnold, Abner and Gerald get to Eduardo's house they noticed that it was trashed and Abner sensed that something was wrong. When Arnold and the others got kidnapped by Lasombra and his crew, Abner swims to shore and catches an airplane back to Hillwood and tells Phil and Gertrude that Arnold and his friends got kidnapped by Lasombra and were in trouble.

References

External links
 Hey Arnold! character guide

Lists of characters in American television animation
Characters
Nicktoon characters
Lists of children's television characters
Animated human characters
Television characters introduced in 1988
Television characters introduced in 1996
Animated characters introduced in 1996